State Highway 49 (SH 49) is a designated north–south state highway in Texas, running from Mount Pleasant, Texas to a point on the Texas-Louisiana border about  north of Caddo Lake, where it meets Louisiana Highway 2, which continues onward to Trees, Louisiana.

State Highway 49 begins at The Bill Ratliff Freeway U.S. Highway 271 in western Mount Pleasant, and progresses in a southeasterly direction, merging with US 259 at the city limits of Daingerfield, running concurrently through the center of the town, then joins State Highway 11, forming a triple concurrency for about one-third of a mile, passing an overpass of the former Louisiana and Arkansas Railway with only 13'6" of clearance.

SH 49 leaves Daingerfield to the east, still concurrent with SH 11, crossing the same railway again just east of Daingerfield State Park, then follows alongside the railway into the town of Hughes Springs, whereafter it splits from SH 11, but continues to follow the L&A corridor further to the southeast, crossing State Highway 155 in Avinger, and U.S. Highway 59 (Future Interstate 369) in Jefferson. SH 49 departs from the L&A and veers sharply northeastward to follow the Missouri Pacific Railroad for several miles, then continues further eastward to the state line.

Overall, SH 49 passes through four Texas counties: Titus, Morris, Cass, and Marion.

Previous routes
 The route was originally designated on August 21, 1923 along its current route, with an extension farther northwest, terminating in Paris along previously designated SH 35. On February 21, 1938, SH 49 Business was designated in Bogata. On September 26, 1939, the section from Paris to Mt. Pleasant had again been transferred, this time to U.S. Highway 271 (which it was cosigned with since 1935). SH 49 Business was renumbered as Loop 38.

Junction list

Notes

References

049
Transportation in Titus County, Texas
Transportation in Morris County, Texas
Transportation in Cass County, Texas
Transportation in Marion County, Texas